Mannarino is an Italian surname. Notable people with the surname include:

Adrian Mannarino (born 1988), French tennis player
Mannarino (singer) (born 1979), Italian singer-songwriter
Tommaso Mannarino, Italian monk and scholar

Italian-language surnames